Wolf Branch may refer to:

Wolf Branch (Big Lake Creek), a stream in Missouri
Wolf Branch (Little Bridge Creek), a stream in Missouri